Hohenbergia ridleyi is a species of flowering plant in the Bromeliaceae family. It is endemic to Brazil (Paraíba, Pernambuco).

References 

ridleyi
Endemic flora of Brazil
Flora of Paraíba
Flora of Pernambuco
Taxa named by John Gilbert Baker
Taxa named by Carl Christian Mez